Para table tennis event at the 2015 Parapan American Games was played from 8–13 August 2015 at the Markham Pan Am Centre.

Participating nations

Medal summary

Medal table

Medalists

References

External links
 Table tennis results

Events at the 2015 Parapan American Games
Parapan
Table tennis competitions in Canada